Henry Fox (October 3, 1833 to September 3, 1906) was a German soldier who fought in the American Civil War. Fox received the United States' highest award for bravery during combat, the Medal of Honor, for his action near Jackson, Tennessee on 23 December 1862. He was honored with the award on 16 May 1899.

Biography
Fox was born in Reutlingen, Germany on 3 October 1833. He enlisted with the 106th Illinois Volunteer Infantry Regiment in August 1862 and was commissioned as a Captain of the 1st Tennessee Infantry Regiment (African Descent) in October 1863.   After the war he became a companion of the Illinois Commandery of the Military Order of the Loyal Legion of the United States.

Fox died on 3 September 1906 and his remains are interred at the Oak Lawn Cemetery in Illinois.

Medal of Honor citation

See also

List of American Civil War Medal of Honor recipients: A–F

References

1833 births
1906 deaths
German-born Medal of Honor recipients
German emigrants to the United States
People of Illinois in the American Civil War
Union Army officers
United States Army Medal of Honor recipients
American Civil War recipients of the Medal of Honor
People from Reutlingen
People from Dwight, Illinois